Tullio Vecchietti (29 July 1914 – 15 January 1999) was an Italian politician and journalist.

Biography
During the Second World War Tullio Vecchietti participated in the Italian resistance movement. From 1951 to 1963 he directed Avanti!, the newspaper of the Italian Socialist Party. He was elected to the Chamber of Deputies for the first time with the PSI in 1953.

Contrary to participation in the government with the Christian Democracy, in 1963 he founded the Italian Socialist Party of Proletarian Unity, together with Lelio Basso, Vittorio Foa, Lucio Libertini and Emilio Lussu and Dario Valori. Vecchietti was secretary of the PSIUP from the foundation until September 1971, when he was replaced by Dario Valori.

After the electoral defeat of 1972, Tullio Vecchietti, together with numerous comrades, joined the Italian Communist Party. He was re-elected deputy in 1976 and senator in 1979, 1983 and 1987.

He died on 15 January 1999.

References

1914 births
1999 deaths
20th-century Italian politicians
Italian Socialist Party politicians
Italian Socialist Party of Proletarian Unity politicians
Italian Communist Party politicians